Shelbourne may refer to:


Dublin, Ireland
Shelbourne Park, a greyhound racing stadium
Shelbourne Hotel, a hotel in the city centre
Shelbourne Road, a neighbourhood around the road with the same name
Shelbourne F.C., an association football club
Shelbourne United F.C., a former football club

Australia

Shelbourne, Victoria, a small town located near Maldon in Victoria, Australia
Shelbourne railway station in the town

Canada
Shelbourne, a neighborhood in Saanich, British Columbia

People with the surname
Cecily Shelbourne, pseudonym of Suzanne Goodwin (1916–2008), British writer
Philip Shelbourne (1924–1993), British lawyer and financier, chairman of merchant bank Samuel Montagu & Co.
Roy Mahlon Shelbourne (1890–1974), United States district judge in Kentucky

See also
 Shelburne (disambiguation)